PPPS may refer to:

 in a document, a post-post-postscript
 People's Press Printing Society, the publishers of the British Morning Star newspaper
 Prior Park Preparatory School, a former Roman Catholic independent school in Cricklade, England
 Positive Pressure Personnel Suit. a whole body personal protective suit designed to prevent contamination from outside
 Pulitzer Prize for Public Service, annual journalistic excellency award
 Paw Paw Public Schools, Michigan